Dom Darreh may refer to:
Dom Darreh, Kohgiluyeh and Boyer-Ahmad
Dom Darreh, Lorestan